Aleshniki is a rural locality (a selo) and the administrative center of Alyoshnikovskoye Rural Settlement, Zhirnovsky District, Volgograd Oblast, Russia. The population was 852 as of 2010. There are 9 streets.

Geography 
Aleshniki is located in forest steppe, on Volga Upland, 39 km southeast of Zhirnovsk (the district's administrative centre) by road. Podchinny is the nearest rural locality.

References 

Rural localities in Zhirnovsky District
Kamyshinsky Uyezd